Frangollo is a Canarian dessert dish, made from milk, millet or maize flour, lemon, eggs, sugar, butter, raisins, almonds, and cinnamon. Many variations exist, for example replacing the milk with water, or adding aniseed.

See also
Canarian cuisine
 List of desserts

External links
  Recipe
 Alternative recipe

Desserts
Spanish cuisine